Joe Bataan (also spelled Bataán) (born Bataan Nitollano; November 15, 1942) is a Latin soul musician from New York.

Early life
Joe Bataan was born Bataan Nitollano and grew up in the 103rd Street and Lexington Avenue part of East Harlem in New York. In East Harlem, Bataan briefly led the Dragons, a local Puerto Rican street gang.  Bataan served time in the Coxsackie Correctional Facility for a stolen car charge. His father was Filipino and his mother was African American.

Career
Upon his release from prison in 1965, Bataan turned his attention to music and formed his first band, Joe Bataan and the Latin Swingers. Bataan was influenced by two musical styles: the Latin boogaloo and African American doo-wop. Though Bataan was neither the first nor only artist to combine doo-wop-style singing with Latin rhythms, his talent for it drew the attention of Fania Records. After signing with them in 1966, Bataan released Gypsy Woman in 1967. (The title track is a Latin dance cover of "Gypsy Woman" by The Impressions). He would, in full, release eight original titles for Fania which included the gold-selling Riot!. These albums often mixed energetic Latin dance songs, sung in Spanish, with slower, English-language soul ballads sung by Bataan himself. As a vocalist, Bataan's fame in the Latin music scene at the time was only rivaled by Ralfi Pagan.

Disagreements over money with Fania Records head Jerry Masucci led Bataan to eventually leave the label. While still signed to Fania however, Bataan secretly started Ghetto Records, a Latin music label which got its initial funding from a local gangster, George Febo. Bataan produced several albums for other artists, including Papo Felix, Paul Ortiz and Orquesta Son and Eddie Lebron.

In 1973, he helped coin the phrase "salsoul", lending its name to his first post-Fania album. Along with the Cayre brothers, Kenneth, Stanley, and Joseph, he co-founded the Salsoul label, though later sold out his interest. He recorded three albums for Salsoul and several singles, including "Rap-O Clap-O" from 1979 which became an early hip hop hit. After his 1981 album, Bataan II, he retired from music-making to spend more time with his family and ended up working as a youth counselor in one of the reformatories he himself had spent time in as a teenager.

In 2005, Bataan teamed up with producer Daniel Collás to break his long hiatus with the release of Call My Name, a well-received album recorded in New York for Spain's Vampisoul label.

Bataan is also the father of Asia Nitollano, winner of Pussycat Dolls Present: The Search for the Next Doll.

In the 2006 video game, Driver: Parallel Lines, Joe Bataan's song "Subway Joe" was included in the soundtrack.

In early 2009, Bataan was featured in the Kenzo Digital-produced "beat cinematic" City of God's Son. Bataan was featured as the narrator of the story, playing the part of an older Nas reflecting upon his youth in the street with cohorts Jay-Z, Ghostface Killah, Biggie and Raekwon.

In 2013, Bataan received the Lifetime Achievement Award from the New York chapter of the Filipino American National Historical Society.

In 2014, he met Osman Jr, from French group Setenta which, in collaboration with promoter Benjamin Levy, leads him to play for the first time in Paris in June 2015 at Le théatre des Etoiles, followed by a historic live at the Jazz Mix de Vienne in France. In September 2015, Bataan sang "My Rainbow", a soulful bolero composed by the French band. This title was released in 2016 on the album Paris to Nueva York released by Latin Big Note. With Setenta as this backing band, Bataan travels and plays on famous scenes as Selma in Stockholm (Sweden), Ronnie Scott's (London), the FGO (Paris), the Summer Stage in New York and the Théatre de la Mer of Fiest'a Sète (France).

In 2015, Bataan featured on vocal on Alex Puddu's album Soul Tiger on three songs "The Mover", "Love Talk" and "50,000 Women Can't Be Wrong". The last two songs were written by Puddu/Bataan and released by Schema Records.

In 2016, Bataan (along with the Barrio Boys) performed at the FANHS National Conference in New York- where 500 conference attendees danced to his music while cruising the Hudson River on the Hornblower 'Infinity'.

In 2017, Bataan collaborated with Spanglish Fly, the boogaloo revival group based in New York City, to record New York Rules, written by Manuel Garcia-Orozco and Jonathan Goldman, released on the band's Ay Que Boogaloo! by record label Chaco World Music. Singing lead vocals, Bataan includes references to his famous songs "Subway Joe" and "Rap-o Clap-o." The Huffington Post calls this recording "charming, spellbinding and irresistible." A remix of the song is included on the soundtrack to She's Gotta Have It (2019), written and directed by Spike Lee.

Discography
 1967: Gypsy Woman (Fania 340)
 1968: Subway Joe (Fania 345)
 1968: Riot! (Fania 354)
 1969: Poor Boy (Fania 371)
 1970: Singin' Some Soul (Fania 375)
 1971: Mr. New York & The East Side Kids (Fania 395)
 1972: Sweet Soul (Fania 407)
 1972: Saint Latin's Day Massacre (Fania 420)
 1972: Live From San Frantasia (unreleased, Fania 432)
 1973: Salsoul (Mericana)
 1975: Afro-Filipino (Salsoul/Epic Records)
 1980: Mestizo (Salsoul)
 1981: II (Salsoul)
 1997: Last Album, Last Song (Bataan Music)
 2004: Young, Gifted & Brown: Joe's Sweetest Soul Singin''' (Vampisoul)
 2005: Call My Name (Vampisoul)
 2009: King of Latin Soul (Vampisoul)
 2016: My Rainbow on the album Paris to Nueva York - Setenta (Latin Big Note)
 2017:  "New York Rules" on the album, Spanglish Fly, "Ay Que Boogaloo!" (Chaco World Music)

See also
Filipino hip hop

References

External links

Interview by Michael 'The Dood' Edwards 'UK Vibe' June 2009
RBMA Radio On Demand - Melbourne Marvels - Joe Bataan (Suss'D)
Joe Bataan article in the LA Weekly, 15 December 1999
Joe Bataan interview
Joe Bataan interview, from APEX Express'' radio program, KPFA FM, Berkeley, California (MP3)
TheSoulGirl.com

1942 births
20th-century African-American male singers
American musicians of Filipino descent
Fania Records artists
Living people
Salsoul Records artists
Rappers from Manhattan
Filipino people of African-American descent
21st-century American rappers
People from East Harlem
21st-century African-American male singers